Power is the third album by John Hall, released in 1979 on Columbia Records subsidiary ARC Records. The title track is used as an anthem against nuclear power.

Track listing

Personnel
John Hall - lead vocals, keyboards, guitar
Eric Parker - drums
David Schwartz - bass
Tony Levin - bass (2, 4)
Louis Levin - keyboards
Jody Linscott - percussion
Bryan Cumming - saxophone, guitar (4, 6)
Mike Mainieri - vibraphone (8)

Production
Producer: John Hall
Engineers: Gene Paul, Lew Hahn, John Holbrook
Photography: Eric Meola

References

External links

1979 albums
ARC Records albums